Senator Parr may refer to:

Archie Parr (1860–1942), Texas State Senate
Edmund Parr (1849–1925), Virginia State Senate